Shelby is a city in Richland County in the U.S. state of Ohio, northwest of the city of Mansfield. It is part of the Mansfield, Ohio Metropolitan Statistical Area. The population was 9,317 as of the 2010 census.

History
Shelby was originally called Gamble's Mills, and under the latter name was platted in 1834. 

On April 14, 2019, Shelby was struck by a long tracked EF2 Tornado with winds of 120-125 MPH. At its peak, the tornado was a half mile wide.  The tornado damaged more than half a dozen homes, as well as a car dealership on the south of side of Shelby.

Geography

Shelby is located at  (40.884645, -82.659529), along the Black Fork of the Mohican River.

Much of the water area consists of the Black Fork of the Mohican River, which flows through downtown; its location makes the city vulnerable to floods.

Demographics

2000 census
As of the census of 2000, there were 9,821 people, 4,073 households, and 2,667 families residing in the city. The population density was 1,949.3 people per square mile (752.4/km). There were 4,330 housing units at an average density of 859.4 per square mile (331.7/km). The racial makeup of the city was 98.40% White, 0.14% African American, 0.18% Native American, 0.35% Asian, 0.37% from other races, and 0.56% from two or more races. Hispanic or Latino of any race were 1.02% of the population.

There were 4,073 households, out of which 31.6% had children under the age of 18 living with them, 52.1% were married couples living together, 10.0% had a female householder with no husband present, and 34.5% were non-families. 30.8% of all households were made up of individuals, and 14.3% had someone living alone who was 65 years of age or older. The average household size was 2.38 and the average family size was 2.97.

In the city the population was spread out, with 25.7% under the age of 18, 8.6% from 18 to 24, 26.8% from 25 to 44, 22.6% from 45 to 64, and 16.3% who were 65 years of age or older. The median age was 37 years. For every 100 females, there were 91.4 males. For every 100 females age 18 and over, there were 85.1 males.

The median income for a household in the city was $35,938, and the median income for a family was $43,373. Males had a median income of $32,551 versus $21,573 for females. The per capita income for the city was $17,096. About 7.4% of families and 10.2% of the population were below the poverty line, including 16.1% of those under age 18 and 7.4% of those age 65 or over.

2010 census
As of the census of 2010, there were 9,317 people, 3,911 households, and 2,510 families residing in the city. The racial makeup of the city was 98.2% White, 0.2% African American, 0.2% Native American, 0.3% Asian, 0.2% from other races, and 1.0% from two or more races. Hispanic or Latino of any race were 1.2% of the population.

There were 3,911 households, of which 31.3% had children under the age of 18 living with them, 47.5% were married couples living together, 12.7% had a female householder with no husband present, 4.0% had a male householder with no wife present, and 35.8% were non-families. 31.3% of all households were made up of individuals, and 14.1% had someone living alone who was 65 years of age or older. The average household size was 2.34 and the average family size was 2.91.

The median age in the city was 40.1 years. 24.5% of residents were under the age of 18; 8% were between the ages of 18 and 24; 24.2% were from 25 to 44; 25.6% were from 45 to 64; and 17.6% were 65 years of age or older. The gender makeup of the city was 47.0% male and 53.0% female.

Notable people
 Joseph Carens, Professor of Political Science at The University of Toronto
 Charles Follis, the first black professional football player, played for the Shelby Blues Football team.
 Joel Hunter, retired pastor of Northland Community Church, Casselberry, FL
 Dawn Powell, a writer from the 20th century, lived in Shelby for a period of time.
 Larry Siegfried, professional basketball player who played for Boston Celtics  and  earlier for the Ohio State Buckeyes.  Lived in Shelby.
 William W. Skiles, a U.S. congressman. The football field is named after him.

Parks
The city of Shelby has five parks which are operated and maintained by the city of Shelby Parks Department.

Library

The sole library in the city of Shelby is Marvin Memorial Library.  Marvin Library offers Story Time and summer reading programs for youth, a Teen Cafe for teenagers and the Adult Book Club for adults. Community meeting rooms and computer access are also offered through the library.

Marvin Library is named for Daniel Marvin, a veteran of the American Civil War, and son of Stephen and Sarah (Burr) Marvin who built the first frame house in Shelby. He studied law, went to California during the gold rush, then returned to Ohio by the outbreak of the Civil War, during which he participated in the battles of Shiloh & Stone River, and was severely wounded. Marvin practiced law for many years.  He purchased the house on West Whitney Avenue for $6,500 and presented it to the city in the early 1900s. His generosity to the city was greatly appreciated and memorialized in the name of the library.

Public safety
 Fire and EMS - Shelby Fire Department
 Police - Shelby Police Department - 17 sworn officers and 4 dispatchers.

Facilities
As a result of the 2007 flooding, the former police department building was severely damaged and was demolished in August 2009.  In May 2011, Shelby voters approved a bond issue allowing for construction of a new police and court facility, which opened in December 2012.

The Shelby Fire Department operates out of the oldest operating fire station in the state of Ohio, built in 1872. Though also heavily damaged in the 2007 flood, the Shelby Fire Department remained in their historic building alongside the Black Fork of the Mohican River.

METRICH

The Shelby Police Department works jointly with METRICH, an investigative group that began in 1986 with a goal of reducing availability of illegal drugs in Richland County region.

Education
  
Shelby's public education is provided by the Shelby City School District [6]. The district serves students in kindergarten through high school in six school facilities. Shelby High School built a new, state of the art facility adjacent to the current high school's location. The new Shelby High School opened in 2013. Shelby High School was one of five "Race to the Top" grant recipients in the State of Ohio in 2011 and is scheduled to implement a new technology & project based curriculum as a result.

See also

 Shelby Cycle Company, a bicycle manufacturer formerly located in Shelby. The Shelby Bicycle Days Festival takes place in early July in downtown Shelby.[9]

References

External links
 Shelby Ohio Area History and Genealogy
 City website
 The Shelby Museum of History Website
 
 Shelby, Ohio City-data.com

Cities in Richland County, Ohio
Populated places established in 1834
1834 establishments in Ohio
Cities in Ohio
Sundown towns in Ohio